T.P.E. was a project of dance-pop and Freestyle music formed in 1991 by music producer Adam Marano, who also was the only member of the project. T.P.E means The Philadelphia Experiment. and it was one of the first projects created by Adam Marano before creating what would become his most famous project, the Collage. T.P.E. released four singles; the most popular of them being the song "Then Came You", which reached No. 91 on the Billboard Hot 100 in 1991.

The project ended its activities in 1994, when they released their last single, "Dance with Me".

Discography

Studio album

Singles

References

American freestyle musicians
Musical groups established in 1991
1991 establishments in the United States